The following is a list of East Carolina Pirates men's basketball head coaches. There have been 24 head coaches of the Pirates in their 92-season history.

East Carolina's current head coach is Michael Schwartz. He was hired as the Pirates' head coach in March 2022, replacing Joe Dooley, who was fired after the 2021–22 season.

References

East Carolina

East Carolina Pirates men's basketball coaches